Caladenia caerulea, commonly known as the eastern tiny blue china orchid, blue caladenia or blue fairy is a plant in the orchid family Orchidaceae and is endemic to eastern Australia.
It has a single narrow leaf and a single blue flower.

Description 
The sides of the labellum curve upwards and the small tip turns downwards. There are two rows of yellow-tipped calli along the mid-line of the labellum. Flowering occurs from July to September.

Taxonomy and naming 
Caladenia caerulea was first formally described in 1810 by Robert Brown and the description was published in Prodromus florae Novae Hollandiae. In 2000, Stephen Hopper and Andrew Brown changed the name to Cyanicula caerulea, but in 2015, as a result of studies of molecular phylogenetics, the name was changed back to Caladenia caerulea. The specific epithet (caerulea) is a Latin word meaning "sky-blue".

Distribution and habitat 
In Victoria, C. caerulea is mostly found in central areas growing in stony soil on rocky ridges but it also occurs in coastal heath in the east of the state. In New South Wales and the A.C.T. it grows in woodland and shrub on rocky ridges, mostly in the eastern half of the state. It also occurs in the south-east of Queensland.

References 

caerulea
Endemic orchids of Australia
Orchids of New South Wales
Orchids of Queensland
Orchids of Victoria (Australia)
Plants described in 1810